Jarm (also spelled Jurm or Banu Jurum) were an Arab tribe that, in the Middle Ages, lived in Palestine, Hawran and coastal Egypt. The Jarm were a branch of the Tha'laba clan, a subbranch of the Al Jadilah, itself a branch of the large Arab tribe of Tayy.  Some sources, however, consider the Jarm to be from the non-Tayyid tribe of Quda'a. Both the Tayy and the Quda'a were Qahtanite tribes (Arabs originally from Yemen).

In the Middle Ages, during Ayyubid and Mamluk rule, the Jarm inhabited the region between Gaza and through the coastal plain of Palestine. Their main encampments were between Deir al-Balah and Gaza, while they often migrated to the vicinity of Hebron in the summer. Beginning with Sultan Baybars, the Mamluks entrusted the Jarm, along with other Tayyid clans with protecting the countryside, providing Arabian horses for the barid (postal route), and levied taxes on them. The chieftains of Jarm and other Tayyid clans were known as "emirs" (princes). In the Mamluk hierarchy, the military rank of the preeminent emir of the Jarm was equal to that of a Damascus-based amir ashara (emir of ten cavalry) or an Aleppo-based amir ashrin (emir of twenty cavalry). In the Mamluk records, the strength of the Jarm was 1,000 cavalry, making them one of the smaller leading tribes of Bilad al-Sham (the Levant); the largest was Al Fadl, the most powerful Tayyid clan.

In 1415, there was heavy fighting between the Jarm and the A'id tribe in the triangle of Gaza, Ramla and Jerusalem. In 1494, a dispute arose regarding the official nomination of the preeminent emir of the Jarm, a duty normally entrusted to the Mamluk governors of Gaza or Jerusalem. Sultan Qaytbay ultimately intervened and chose the Jerusalem nominee because that district's governor paid a bribe of five hundred dinars. The Jarm chieftains preserved the title of emir during early Ottoman rule in the 16th century and were listed in the tax registers for the Gaza Sanjak. At the time, it had twelve branches and encamped in the vicinity of Ramla. It paid 10,000 akçe to the treasury of the Ottoman sultan.

References

Bibliography

 

Tribes of Syria
Tribes of Arabia
Tayy
History of Gaza City
History of Ottoman Syria
Mamluk Sultanate
Medieval Syria